Battle of Wiesloch may refer to:

Battle of Mingolsheim, fought on April 27, 1622, near the German town of Wiesloch, part of the Thirty Years' War
Battle of Wiesloch (1632), fought on August 16, 1632, part of the Thirty Years' War
Battle of Wiesloch (1799), fought on December 3, 1799, part of the War of the Second Coalition